Nigel Lindsay (born 17 January 1969) is an English actor. He is best known on television for his roles as Sir Robert Peel in the first two seasons of Victoria, Jo Jo Marshall in the Netflix series Safe and as Barry in the BAFTA-winning Chris Morris film Four Lions for which he was nominated for Best British Comedy Performance in Film at the 2011 British Comedy Awards.

In 2012 he was nominated for an Olivier Award for his performance in the title role in the original West End run of Shrek the Musical at the Theatre Royal Drury Lane  and won the Whatsonstage Award for Best Supporting Actor in the 2011 production of Arthur Miller's Broken Glass at the Tricycle Theatre.

Early life and education
Lindsay was born in St John's Wood and grew up in North West London. He attended Merchant Taylors' School, Northwood, an independent private day school for boys before going on to the University of Birmingham, where he studied English and French. After university, he worked for three years as a financial analyst, specialising in French and Belgian equities at London stockbrokers Savory Milln and Swiss Bank Corporation (SBC). But he gave up the city and won a place at bar school and drama school starting on the same day. He opted for the two-year drama course at the Webber Douglas Academy, where he won the Amherst Webber Scholarship. His finals show, in which he appeared as the eponymous Charley's Aunt, was directed by Michael Fry, who gave him his first professional job with the Lincolnshire touring company Great Eastern Stage.

Career
Lindsay's early work was mainly in theatre. One of his first London stage roles saw him play the King of France in King Lear at the Royal Court Theatre, with Tom Wilkinson as Lear and Andy Serkis as the Fool. At a weekly Monday night poker game, Lindsay was asked by Patrick Marber to attend a week's improvisational workshop of a play he was devising about poker. This became Dealer's Choice, which premiered at the National Theatre in February 1995 with Lindsay as Mugsy and Ray Winstone and Phil Daniels among the original cast. The play transferred to the Vaudeville Theatre, and won that year's Evening Standard Award for Best Comedy and Writers' Guild Award for Best Play. Other theatre work includes: Max in The Real Thing by Tom Stoppard, which won three Tonys on Broadway in 2000; Ariel in the 2004 Olivier award-winning National Theatre production of Martin McDonagh's The Pillowman, with Jim Broadbent and David Tennant; twice as Nathan Detroit in Michael Grandage's Guys and Dolls at the Piccadilly Theatre in 2005 and again at the Phoenix Theatre in 2015, and Charlie Maggs in Sucker Punch, with Daniel Kaluuya at the Royal Court in 2010. Lindsay has appeared in five plays at the Almeida Theatre, including as Lenny in Harold Pinter's The Homecoming with Ken Cranham and Danny Dyer in 2009 and as Moe Axelrod alongside Stockard Channing and Jodie Whittaker in Awake and Sing by Clifford Odets, for which he was nominated for Best Supporting Actor in the 2008 Whatsonstage Awards.

Lindsay has appeared in many regular series, including: Unforgotten,   Spooks, Silent Witness, Waking the Dead, Poirot, New Tricks and Inspector George Gently. He played Odo Stevens in the 1997 Channel 4 adaptation of A Dance to the Music of Time; Ewan McGregor's boss Ron Baker in the film Rogue Trader; the Jewish terrorist Levi in Rome; and Lt Col Mervyn Gonin in the BAFTA nominated The Relief of Belsen. He has worked with Steve Coogan on I'm Alan Partridge, Mid-Morning Matters with Alan Partridge, and Alan Partridge: Alpha Papa; with Armando Iannucci on The Armando Iannucci Shows; with Jennifer Saunders in two series of Jam and Jerusalem; and again with Chris Morris on Brass Eye. More recently he appeared as Tony Walsh in two series of the BBC comedy White Gold.

Later theatre work includes playing Bolingbroke opposite David Tennant in the RSC production of Richard II at Stratford and the Barbican; Jack McCracken in the National Theatre revival of the Alan Ayckbourn play A Small Family Business in the Olivier theatre; and Charlie Fox opposite Lindsay Lohan and Richard Schiff in David Mamet's Speed-the-Plow at the Playhouse Theatre in the West End.  In 2021, Lindsay made his debut at Ireland's National Theatre, the Abbey Theatre, in Brian Friel's Faith Healer alongside Niamh Cusack and Aidan Gillen to great critical acclaim.

Theatre and filmography

Theatre

Television

Film

Radio

References

External links

1969 births
Living people
20th-century English male actors
21st-century English male actors
Alumni of the University of Birmingham
English male film actors
English male musical theatre actors
English male radio actors
English male stage actors
English male television actors
Male actors from London
People educated at Merchant Taylors' School, Northwood
People from St John's Wood